This article details the Catalans Dragons rugby league football club's 2021 season.
During the season, they will compete in the Super League XXVI and the 2021 Challenge Cup.

Pre Season

Super League

  

All fixtures are subject to change

League table

Player statistics

As of 3 May 2021

Challenge Cup

2021 transfers

Gains

Losses

2021 squad

Notes

References

External links 
 Catalans Dragons official site  — under construction: 
 Catalans Dragons at Superleague.co.uk
 Sang-Et-Or
 The World of Rugby League
 League Unlimited
 Catalans Dragons stats at rugbyleagueproject.com

Catalans Dragons seasons
Catalans Dragons season
2021 in French rugby league